Isidore Heath Hitler (born 1973), formerly Isidore Heath Campbell, sometimes called Nazi dad, is an American white supremacist and self-described Neo-Nazi who attracted national media attention in December 2008 after the ShopRite in Greenwich Township, New Jersey, refused to make a cake celebrating his son Adolf Hitler Campbell's third birthday. A Walmart in Nazareth, Pennsylvania, later baked and inscribed the cake. Hitler (then known as Heath Campbell) was featured in a documentary, Meet the Hitlers. He is also founder and leader of the pro-Nazi group Hitler's Order.

Hitler resides in Shippensburg, Pennsylvania.

Child naming controversy
Rachel Maddow opined that it was ironic Wal-Mart would bake a cake reading "Happy birthday Adolf Hitler" but would not sell The Chicks albums because of the profane lyrics. Deborah Campbell pointed out that the name "Adolf" is in the baby names book as "noble wolf". Forensic psychologist N.G. Berill claimed, "To strap a kid with that kind of name is incredibly abusive and short-sighted." Similar sentiments were expressed by one of the commentators on The David Pakman Show.

Hitler said, "This is America. They say it's free. You have a right to name your child what you want to name your child, no matter what. It shouldn't have a meaning to it. A name's a name." Hitler claims, "Nobody has a problem with my son's name, at all. At all. They know his full name. The kids, he plays soccer, he plays all that. And that, that's what I'm saying. Nobody bothers him." Deborah Campbell later announced an intention to rename her son Antonio Campbell.

Appearance and habits
Hitler has several Nazi-related tattoos and a toothbrush mustache to resemble the Nazi dictator Adolf Hitler. When he was younger he used to sport long brown hair, but as of now he keeps it in a short trimmed undercut hairstyle, typical of Nazi Germany during the Second World War. The swastika tattoo on his neck was criticized in The Young Turks as poorly drawn by the tattoo artist. However, the show concluded by a 2–1 vote that Hitler’s children should be returned to him, with Cenk Uygur arguing, "You should be allowed to be a Nazi, neo-Nazi, any kind of thing, according to the First Amendment. Now if we say, 'Hey, you're allowed to do that, but we're gonna take your kids away,' I would argue that that's a very interesting First Amendment case, at the very least." When questioned about his tattoos, Hitler pointed out that he also has a yin yang tattoo and that the Nazis were not the only ones to use swastikas as a symbol.

Hitler began wearing a Nazi uniform in June 2012, when he founded the Hitler's Order. Hitler’s landlord described the family as clean and non-destructive.

Relationships and children
Hitler has had nine children with five women. One of his wives was Cathy Bowlby, who claimed Hitler beat her repeatedly and wanted to name his first-born son Lucifer until she convinced him to name him Heath.

Hitler’s third wife was Deborah Campbell (birth name Deborah Lynn McCollum). According to a birth certificate, Adolf Hitler Campbell was born to them at 6:20 am on December 14, 2005 at Hunterdon Medical Center in Raritan Township, New Jersey. Their other children are JoyceLynn Aryan Nation, Honszlynn Hinler Jeannie, and Heinrich Hons. The latter was taken by Child Protective Services from them hours after being born.

He also had a child, Eva Lynn Patricia Braun, with girlfriend Bethanie Rose Zito (sometimes known as Bethanie White), who later became his fiancée when she was 22 years old. Hitler and Zito both went to a custody hearing wearing Nazi regalia.

Based on anonymous reports of violence, all of Hitler’s children have been taken away by New Jersey's Division of Youth and Family Services and put in foster care. However, he has said that he will continue having kids as long as the government keeps taking them away. According to a lehighvalleylive article:

As of June 2012, Hitler and Deborah were separated. An ABC News article says:

According to that article, "One of his ex-wives has a restraining order against him and has 'moved to an Air Force base with family in Florida to be away and safe from him, court papers said.

Legal problems
At a June 3, 2013, court hearing, Hitler showed up in a Nazi uniform and said, "If they're good judges and they're good people, they'll look within, not what's on the outside."

Hitler was arrested on March 10, 2016, in Shippensburg, Pennsylvania. He was ordered held in lieu of $10,000 cash bond. He pleaded guilty in Superior Court to obstruction of justice and resisting arrest. He was sentenced to 180 days in jail and two years of probation. The charges stemmed from a report of domestic violence by Zito which she later recanted.

Specifically, Zito said her injuries weren't inflicted by Hitler as she originally claimed. Rather, she said, he left after an argument and she was mad at him so she went to work in a shed. While in there she was throwing things around, and a shelf held up by a few nails fell on her, cutting her face, Zito said. She said this was in retaliation for his leaving her for another woman. Another account Zito gave was that she collided with Deborah: "Technically, when she hit me, it was my fault. I'm the one who slipped downstairs into her elbow. We were both on the stairs."

Prosecutors proceeded without Zito's cooperation and charged him with aggravated assault. He was extradited to New Jersey after having been on the list of most-wanted fugitives. Although earlier news stories said that Campbell could not read, in August 2016, Campbell claimed to have written Mein Kampf III and IV while in jail and announced an intention to publish the new volumes after he finished working on them. In February 2017, on Valentine's Day, Hitler (then known as Heath Campbell) filed to high court to legally change his last name to Hitler. A hearing was held on March 24, and his name change was approved on May 8.

References

External links

1973 births
Living people
American neo-Nazis
American Holocaust deniers
Antisemitism in the United States
People from Shippensburg, Pennsylvania